Nadagara vigaia is a moth of the family Geometridae first described by the  entomologist  Francis Walker in 1862. It is found in Sri Lanka.

References

Moths of Asia
Moths described in 1862